Typha kalatensis is a plant species endemic to Iran. The species grows in freshwater marshes. Type collection was made near the City of Kalat in Khorassan Province.

References

kalatensis
Freshwater plants
Endemic flora of Iran
Plants described in 2003